The Heller is a 30 km long river in western Germany. It is a left tributary of the Sieg. The source is located near Haiger in Hesse. It flows through Burbach and Neunkirchen in North Rhine-Westphalia. It flows into the river Sieg in Betzdorf, Rhineland-Palatinate. Its basin area is 204 km².

See also
List of rivers of North Rhine-Westphalia
List of rivers of Rhineland-Palatinate
List of rivers of Hesse

References

Rivers of North Rhine-Westphalia
Rivers of Rhineland-Palatinate
Rivers of Hesse
Rivers of Siegerland
Rivers of the Westerwald
Rivers of Germany